Groff Mountain is a summit located in Adirondack Mountains of New York located in the Towns of Hope and Benson, northwest of the hamlet of Hope.

References

Mountains of Hamilton County, New York
Mountains of New York (state)